Just Beyond is an American horror comedy anthology series created by Seth Grahame-Smith based on Boom! Studios' graphic novels of the same name by R. L. Stine for Disney+. The series premiered on October 13, 2021, with all 8 episodes.

Cast

Episode 1 - Leave Them Kids Alone 
 Mckenna Grace as Veronica
 Leeann Ross as Claire
 Nasim Pedrad as Miss Genevieve
 Lauren Lindsey Donzis as Heather

Episode 2 - Parents Are From Mars, Kids Are From Venus 
 Gabriel Bateman as Jack
 Arjun Athalye as Ronald
 Tim Heidecker as Dale
 Riki Lindhome as Bonnie
 Parvesh Cheena as Ron Sr.
 Henry Thomas as Crazy Chris
 William Tokarsky as Floating Head
 Rajani Nair as Gloria

Episode 3 - Which Witch 
 Rachel Marsh as Fiona
 Jy Prishkulnik as Luna

Episode 4 - My Monster 
 Megan Stott as Olivia
 Sally Pressman as Brook
 Elisha Henig as Graham
 Marcelle LeBlanc as Jade
 Camryn Jade as Chloe
 Max Bickelhaup as The Squeamber

Episode 5 - Unfiltered 
 Izabela Vidovic as Lilis
 Christine Ko as Ms. Fausse
 Jordan Sherley as Carmen
 Leela Owen as Harper
 Connor Christie as Ben

Episode 6 - We've Got Spirits, Yes We Do 
 Lexi Underwood as Ella
 Kate Baldwin as Vivian
 Ben Gleib as Oscar
 Jackson Geach as Raymond
 Emily Marie Palmer as Rosie
 Claire Andres as Zoe

Episode 7 - Standing Up For Yourself 
 Cyrus Arnold as Trevor
 Logan Gray as Little Trevor
 Smera Chandan as Maria
 Spencer Fitgerald as Hudson
 Henry Shepherd as Evan Burger
 Kwajalyn Brown as Principal Angela

Episode 8 - The Treehouse 
 Cedric Joe as Sam
 Christine Adams as Jenny
 Malcolm Barrett as Andy
 Jack Gore as Mason

Episodes

Production 
In early May 2020, Disney+ ordered an eight-episode series based on R. L. Stine's graphic novels Just Beyond attaching Seth Grahame-Smith to write and serve as an executive producer. David Katzenberg, Stephen Christy and Ross Richie also attached to executive producers and Stine as co-executive producer with KatzSmith Productions and 20th Century Fox Television acting as studios behind the project as they have first look deal with Boom! Studios. That same month, the writer's room was assembled.

Filming had begun in Atlanta by March 2021, with Marc Webb directing two episodes. Mckenna Grace and Lexi Underwood were cast as the stars of one episode each in April 2021, with Nasim Pedrad to guest star in an episode. Additional casting was announced in May, with Riki Lindhome, Tim Heidecker, Gabriel Bateman and Henry Thomas added.

Release 
The series debuted on Disney+ on October 13, 2021.

Reception

Critical response 
The review aggregator website Rotten Tomatoes reported an 88% approval rating with an average rating of 6.7/10, based on 8 critic reviews.

Joel Keller of Decider acclaimed the sets and the computer-generated imagery, stating they succeed to intensify the supernatural elements of the series, praised the performances of the cast and the humor, but claimed that the show lacks scary moments. Ashley Moulton of Common Sense Media rated the series 4 out of 5 stars, found agreeable that the protagonists are positive role models, and complimented how the show approaches different themes such as dealing with grief. Dayna Eileen of CGMagazine rated the series 7 out of 10, stated that the show succeeds to introduce the horror genre to unfamiliar viewers, complimented how the series approaches adolescence and spooky themes, but found some dialogues lacking interest. Tara Bennett of IGN rated the series 6 out of 10, praised the performances of the cast, especially Rachel Marsh as a teen witch, but stated that the show focuses too much on morality than providing enough scary moments.

Accolades 
The series was nominated for Children’s Episodic, Long Form and Specials at the 2022 Writers Guild of America Awards.

References

External links
 

2020s American anthology television series
2020s American horror comedy television series
2021 American television series debuts
2021 American television series endings
Boom! Studios adaptations
Disney+ original programming
English-language television shows
Television shows based on comics
Television series by 20th Century Fox Television